The history of West Haven, Connecticut: This article will be covering the colonial and revolutionary history, the economic history, Savin Rock Park, and the 20th century history of West Haven, Connecticut.

Colonial and revolutionary history
The Quinnipiac, Pequot, and Mohegan Native American tribes spent summers near the West Haven green and Morse Park, and as far inland as Maltby Lakes. Before New Haven was colonized in 1638 by five hundred settlers following Reverend John Davenport from the Massachusetts Bay Colony, Dutch trader Adriaen Block noted the high mounds of oyster shells along the shoreline while exploring in 1614.

Settled in 1648, West Haven (then known as West Farms) was a part of the original New Haven Colony. The historic crossing of the West River by horse bridge is commemorated in the 1938 mural, "Fording of the West River to Settle West Haven", in the main post office.

Colonists built both a Congregational meeting house and, in the early 18th century, Christ Episcopal Church, one of the first Episcopal churches in New England. The church was started with the help of Yale College and constructed next door to the meeting house. The Congregational meeting house was the site for all town records, government, events, and housed the first public library in the state of Connecticut.

In 1719, the hamlet separated from the Orange parish as West Haven.

In 1779 the British attacked New Haven Harbor and came ashore in West Haven. Thomas Painter, a militiaman watching for British ships from atop Savin Rock, is depicted on the city seal. The main commercial street, Campbell Avenue, is named for British Adjutant William Campbell, who stopped to help a minister who had been wounded, saving him from being killed, supposedly saying "We make war on soldiers, not civilians"   Campbell himself was killed later that day (July 5, 1779) on Allingtown Hill.  Campbell is buried in the Allingtown section.

Economic history

From colonial times until at least World War II, West Haven was heavily involved in shipping. Ships from West Haven sailed to the West Indies and South America for spices, silks, rum, sugar and similar items in return for local timber. More than 35 ship owners, ship builders, masters and captains from West Haven have been identified with that trade. Tall-masted trade ships were built in town by Scandinavian boat builders, and in World War II, pontoon craft and light weight Chris Craft were built in the community.

Industry was also a major part of the local economy, starting with the West Haven and American Buckle Shops, which produced buckles, buttons, clips, and braces during the American Civil War. These factories were later joined by piano and organ companies. During World War II, Armstrong Rubber Company manufactured tires and rafts for the military.

Savin Rock Park

Savin Rock became a popular vacation spot by the 1870s, when ferries and horse-drawn cars from New Haven created easier access to the site. The New Haven Harbor beachside resort had a playground and carousel. Savin Rock Amusement Park thrived in the 1940s and '50s and was closed in the 1960s. One of the last reminders of the area is Jimmies of Savin Rock, a restaurant known for its seafood and split hot dogs.

Twentieth century

West Haven and North Milford joined to become Orange (incorporated as a town in 1822). In 1921, West Haven split from Orange to become a separate town. It was incorporated as a city in 1961 and is known as "Connecticut's Youngest City."

In 1927, Lender's Beigel Bakery was founded in the city by Polish immigrant Harry Lender.  His customers were primarily Jewish delicatessens in New York City. Lender's sons, Murray and Marvin, later ran the business, specializing in "flash-frozen" bagels, a process that allowed the bagels to be sold nationwide. The business had grown to 600 employees by 1984, when it was sold to Kraft Foods.

West Haven has a mayor-City Council form of government. John M. Picard, the city's tenth mayor, was elected in 2005. There are three independent fire districts served by the West Haven, West Shore and Allingtown fire departments.

Notes

External links
West Haven Historical Society
Ward-Heitman House Museum

West Haven, Connecticut
West Haven